is a fashion and music event held on October 24, 2015, at Yoyogi National Gymnasium 1st Gymnasium in Tokyo, Japan. Tokyo Girls' Style appeared as an opening act performer. The main MCs were Ryōta Yamasato and Naomi Watanabe.

Models 

 Aya Asahina, Saki Asamiya, AMO, Hitomi Arai(Tokyo Girls' Style), Mayuko Arisue, Elaiza Ikeda, Rika Izumi, Nina Itō, Alisa Urahama, emma, Emiri Miyasaka, Elli-Rose, Mitsuki Oishi, Kana Oya, Nonoka Ono, Kaede, Saya Kagawa, Miwako Kakei, Nana Katō, Mayuko Kawakita, Kiki&Lala, Reina Kizu, Kiwa, Rikako Sakata, Remi Sakamoto, Yui Sakuma, Arisa Sato, Harumi Satō, Satoumi, Hinako Sano, Shione Sawada, Yuki Shikanuma, Yuumi Shida, Mayu Sugieda, Sonmi, Dakota Rose, Ai Takahashi, Eri Tachibana, Tina Tamashiro, Ryōta Tsuge, Hazuki Tsuchiya, Reina Triendl, Minori Nakada, An Nakamura, Nana(After School), Nanao, Tomoko Nozaki, Moeka Nozaki, Karen Fujii, Shuuka Fujii, Nicole Fujita, Akane Hotta, Maggy, Airi Matsui, Erika Matsumoto, Yuka Mizuhara, Juliana Minato, Akina Minami, Yōko Melody, Hikari Mori, Alissa Yagi, Hirona Yamazaki, Haruka Yamashita, Yu Yamada, Yūki Yamamoto, Chisato Yoshiki, Loveli
 Non-no models: Mao Ueda, Azusa Okamoto, Yūna Suzuki, Miki Satō, Yuko Araki, Yua Shinkawa, Sayaka Okada, Hinako Kinoshita, Anri Okamoto, Akiko Kuji, Riho Takada, Niina Endō, Fumika Baba, Haru Izumi,  Mina Sayado, Yūka Suzuki
 Seventeen models: Ayaka Miyoshi, Ayami Nakajo, Manami Enosawa, Marie Iitoyo, Sachi Fujii, Nanami Abe, Miki Shimomura, Ai Hashizume, Natsumi Okamoto, Reina Kurosaki, Mayū Yokota, Karen Ōtomo, Momoko Tanabe

Artists 
 XOX, Ayame Goriki, Shinee, Chōtokkyū, Scandal, Dempagumi.inc, Nogizaka46, Sonoko Inoue, Tokyo Girls' Style, Miracle Vell Magic

Guests 
 Keiko Kitagawa, GENKING, Ai Takahashi, Nozomi Tsuji, Manami Hashimoto, E-girls

Brands 
 Bershka, Dickies, EMODA, FOREVER 21, GUILD PRIME, GYDA, Heather, JEANASIS, JILL by JILLSTUART, KIMONO PRINCESS, LOVELESS, LOWRYS FARM, Me%, Million Carats, MURUA, OLD NAVY, OLIVE des OLIVE, REDYAZEL, RESEXXY, Samantha Thavasa, Samantha Vega, SPINNS, Stradivarius, Ungrid, WEGO

References

External links 
 

Fashion events in Japan
Japanese fashion
Japanese subcultures
Events in Tokyo
Annual events in Japan
Semiannual events
October 2015 events in Japan